Benjamin Allen (1830 – December 23, 1912) was a Canadian politician and retail merchant.

Born in Sligo, Ireland, the son of William Allen who was of English descent, Allen first came to Canada in 1850. He went to Australia in 1852, returning to Canada West in 1856, and settled in Owen Sound. In 1857, he married May Cruthers. Allen served as a member of the town council for Owen Sound and was license commissioner from 1876 to 1882. He was elected in 1882 to the House of Commons of Canada as a member of the Liberal Party representing the riding of Grey North.

References 

1830 births
1912 deaths
Irish emigrants to Canada (before 1923)
Liberal Party of Canada MPs
Members of the House of Commons of Canada from Ontario
Politicians from County Sligo